Herjavec (/hərˈdʒɑːvɛk/; Croatian: [xěrjaːʋet͡s]) is a Croatian surname that may refer to
Kym Herjavec (born 1976), Australian ballroom dancer and television performer 
Robert Herjavec (born 1962), Croatian-Canadian businessman, investor, and television personality

See also
Stadion Varteks, a football stadium in Varaždin, Croatia, that locals have nicknamed for former team president Anđelko Herjavec (1958–2001)

Croatian surnames